Andrew Ian Ripley (born 10 December 1975) is an English former footballer who played as a winger in the Football League for Darlington.

Ripley came through the youth system at Darlington, and made his first-team debut as a 17-year-old, on 9 October 1993, as a substitute in a 2–1 defeat at home to Chester City in the Third Division. He made one more substitute appearance in the league, and started in the second round of the Associate Members' Cup, before moving into non-league football, first with Peterlee Newtown. He later spent six seasons with Billingham Synthonia for whom he made nearly 200 appearances in all competitions, of which 148 were made in the Northern League.

References

1975 births
Living people
Footballers from Middlesbrough
English footballers
Association football wingers
Darlington F.C. players
Peterlee Town F.C. players
Billingham Synthonia F.C. players
English Football League players
Northern Football League players